Incheon International Airport Terminal 1 Station is a railway station on AREX and Incheon Airport Maglev. It is in Incheon International Airport's transport center near Terminal 1.

Both commuter("All-stop") and express services stop at this station. While express service directly heads to Seoul Station, commuter service stops at all station.

Incheon Airport Maglev can also be accessed from the same building.

Former KTX Service
Since June 2014, KTX operated from this station with stops at Geomam station and Seoul Station towards Busan and Gwangju. Before the KTX opened services at this station, there was high-leveled platform which had no use. Since this time, only this platform didn't have platform screen doors because there was a plan for a 2nd airport railroad to go there, but this plan changed to KTX. After that, KTX started to run, they have changed the empty platform to a low leveled-platform to make KTX rideable. In the same year, KTX expanded service to Incheon Airport. Since 2018, KTX service to Incheon Airport has been suspended and the suspension became permanent in September 2018 as the line was officially abolished due to low demand and ridership.

Travelling to cities other than Seoul by rail is now only available through a transfer at Seoul Station or Gwangmyeong Station by AREX or bus. In 2019, the KTX service was temporally operative again with 3 daily services to Gwangju, because of the 2019 World Aquatics Championships. The service started on July 9, and finished on July 29.

Fares
 Express service: 8,000 won/adult, 6,900 won/child (the original intended fare was 14,300 won but was reduced to encourage usage).
 Commuter Service: It depends on the station embarked, but from Seoul Station to Incheon International Airport Station it is 4,150 won as of October 2017.

Station layout

References 

Airport railway stations in South Korea
Metro stations in Incheon
Jung District, Incheon
Railway stations opened in 2007
Seoul Metropolitan Subway stations
Incheon International Airport
2007 establishments in South Korea